

1967

23 March
Worst ground aviation accident of Vietnam War occurs at Da Nang Air Base, South Vietnam when traffic controller clears USMC Grumman A-6A Intruder, BuNo 152608, of VMA(AW)-242, MAG-11, for takeoff but also clears USAF Lockheed C-141A-LM Starlifter, 65-9407, of the 62nd Military Airlift Wing, McChord AFB, Washington, to cross runway. A-6 crew sees Starlifter at last moment, veers off runway to try to avoid it, but port wing slices through C-141's nose, which immediately catches fire, load of 72 acetylene gas cylinders ignite and causes tremendous explosion, only loadmaster escaping through rear hatch. Intruder overturns, skids on down runway on back, but both crew, Capt. Frederick Cone and Capt. Doug Wilson, survive, crawl out of smashed canopy after jet stops. Some of ordnance load of 16 X 500 lb. bombs and six rocket packs go off in ensuing fire. Military Airlift Command crew killed are Capt. Harold Leland Hale, Capt. Leroy Edward Leonard, Capt. Max Paul Starkel, S/Sgt. Alanson Garland Bynum, and S/Sgt. Alfred Funck. This is the first of two C-141s lost during the conflict, and one of only three strategic airlifters written off during the Vietnam War.

1971

15 November
A U.S. Navy Grumman A-6A Intruder, BuNo. 151563, of VA-42, on a maintenance test flight out of NAS Oceana, Virginia, suffers failure of the drogue chute gun in the pilot's ejection seat, pulling the two ejection seat cables and ejecting Lt. Dalton C. Wright. The bombardier-navigator, Lt. John W. Adair, with no pilot in the aircraft, is forced to eject. Jet comes down 15 miles from Oceana. The Navy investigation later determines that five or six flight accidents and one hangar accident may have been caused by the same problem. One source cites date of 15 October 1971.

1973

19 September
A U.S. Navy Grumman A-6A Intruder, BuNo 155721, 'NJ', of VA-128, out of NAS Whidbey Island, Washington, crashes in the Oregon desert, ~25 miles SE of Christmas Valley, Oregon, during a low level night training mission. The pilot Lt. Alan G. Koehler, 27, and navigator Lt. Cdr. Philip D. duHamel, 33, are KWF. On 14 June 2007, the Bureau of Land Management (BLM) officially declares the crash scene a historic Federal government site at a Flag Day ceremony. An interpretive plaques was unveiled during this event reflecting this designation and depicting the historical significance of the location.

1991

10 October
 A U.S. Navy  A-6E Intruder BuNo. 152620/NE-407 of VA-155, US Navy, based at Whidbey Island NAS, crashed into the Columbia River, 12 miles southeast of Wenatchee, Chelan County, Washington. Both crew - Lt Commander Dan David "Dewey" DeWispelaere (pilot) and Lt (JG) Grady Hackwith (bombardier/navigator) - were killed.

 "Lt. Cmdr. Dan David "Dewey" DeWispelaere, 32, a Navy pilot who flew more than 40 missions from the aircraft carrier Ranger in the Persian Gulf War, was killed Oct. 10 in the crash of his A-6E Intruder near Wenatchee, Wash.

 His navigator-bombardier, Lt. (j.g.) Grady Hackwith, was also killed. The plane was based at the Naval Air Station at Whidbey Island, Wash., and was on a low-level training flight when it crashed into a cliff and fell into the Columbia River about 12 miles southeast of Wenatchee. Navy officials said the cause of the crash was under investigation."

1994

5 April 
A U.S. Navy  A-6E Intruder out of Alameda Naval Air Station crashed in San Francisco Bay. 33-year-old reservist pilot Lt. Cmdr. Rand McNally and his navigator Lt Cmdr. Brian McMahon were killed in the crash. The pair perished while making a turn to land at the base. An investigation later found that the aircraft suffered from numerous mechanical problems, which likely contributed to the incident.

1998
3 February 1998 EA6B cuts cable car support leaving 20 dead in the Cavalese cable car disaster (1998)

See also

List of accidents and incidents involving military aircraft (1960–74)
List of accidents and incidents involving military aircraft (1990–1999)

References

Grumman A-6 Intruder